This is a list of Azerbaijani musicians and musical groups.

Ashiq music

Azerbaijani folk / instrumental

Classical

Azerbaijani classical / traditional

Composers

Western classical / Azerbaijani symphonic

Hip hop

Jazz

Meykhana

 Aghasalim Childagh

Mugham

Pop

Rock

See also 
 Music of Azerbaijan
 Mugham
 Meykhana
 Azerbaijani hip hop

 
Musicians
Azerbaijanis